Clematepistephium is a genus of flowering plants from the orchid family, Orchidaceae. It contains only one known species, Clematepistephium smilacifolium, endemic to the island of New Caledonia. Its closest relative is Eriaxis, also endemic to New Caledonia.

See also 
 List of Orchidaceae genera

References 

 Pridgeon, A.M., Cribb, P.J., Chase, M.A. & Rasmussen, F. eds. (1999). Genera Orchidacearum 1. Oxford Univ. Press.
 Pridgeon, A.M., Cribb, P.J., Chase, M.A. & Rasmussen, F. eds. (2001). Genera Orchidacearum 2. Oxford Univ. Press.
 Pridgeon, A.M., Cribb, P.J., Chase, M.A. & Rasmussen, F. eds. (2003). Genera Orchidacearum 3. Oxford Univ. Press
 Berg Pana, H. 2005. Handbuch der Orchideen-Namen. Dictionary of Orchid Names. Dizionario dei nomi delle orchidee. Ulmer, Stuttgart

External links 

Vanilleae
Endemic flora of New Caledonia
Orchids of New Caledonia
Monotypic orchid genera
Vanilloideae genera